The Icelandic Men's Super Cup (Icelandic: Meistarakeppni karla) is an annual football game between the reigning champions of the Úrvalsdeild karla and the Icelandic Cup holders (or, if the same team holds both titles, between the title-holder and (usually) the team in second place in the Úrvalsdeild or occasionally the second-place team in the Icelandic Cup). It generally takes place at the start of the Iceland domestic season, in May and has been running uninterrupted since 2003 (when the holders of the 2002 titles met). Before that the competition was  uninterrupted between 1969 and 1999. Title-holders from 1999, 2000 and 2001 did not play for this title.

The most successful team is Valur with a total of eleven wins.

Past finals

There were two games played in 1996 and 1998, one in the spring and one in the autumn, with the spring-game covering the year before and the autumn-game covering the just-finished season. For easier understanding the years listed are always the year after a team won the Úrvalsdeild or Cup (so the autumn games are listed as having been played the year after they were played).

1 - After Extra Time
2 - Penalties
3 - Four matches were played between the two teams. The first finished 1-1, the second 3–0 to KR and the third (listed above) decided the title, with KR winning 4–2. The fourth match then finished 6–1 to KR.
4 - ÍBA (later split into Þór A. and KA) and Keflavík played four matches for the title, twice home and twice away. The first two matches finished 2–0 to the away team with things tied. The third match finished 1-1, with the teams yet tied, and so the fourth match (listed above) decided the title, when Keflavík won 2–1 in Keflavík.
5 - Three teams played each other home and away, the deciding match between teams number 1 and 2 is listed.
6 - Three teams played each other home and away, the deciding match between teams number 1 and 2 is listed. The league champions were third that year (ÍA in 1971, Fram in 1973 and Keflavík in 1974).
7 - Three teams played each other home and away, the deciding match between teams number 1 and 2 is listed. The cup champions were third that year (Víkingur R. in 1972, Valur in 1975 and ÍA in 1979).
8 - The league champions also won the cup.

Results by teams

See also
Atlantic Cup
Icelandic Men's Football League Cup

References

External links
 RSSSF Page
 Soccerway
  IcelandFootball.net - Icelandic Super Cup. 

3
National association football supercups